Overture of the Wicked is an EP by Iced Earth, which was released on June 4, 2007 in Europe and June 5, 2007 in the US. The EP features the band's new single "Ten Thousand Strong" which was recorded for the new album released later that same year Framing Armageddon, as well as a rerecording of the original "Something Wicked" song cycle (from the album Something Wicked This Way Comes). The re-recorded tracks are also slightly rearranged, with the piano intro to "The Coming Curse" notably absent in the new version.  This EP was reissued as part of Iced Earth's Box of the Wicked collection.

The four songs features most of the band's October 2006-March 2007 lineup, with guitarist Jon Schaffer playing bass, as former bassist James "Bo" Wallace left before recording began. Overture of the Wicked is the only official Iced Earth release with former guitarist Tim Mills, and the first with drummer Brent Smedley since 1999's The Melancholy E.P.

On the reasoning behind doing the EP, Tim Owens said:

Track listing

Personnel 
Jon Schaffer – rhythm and lead guitars, bass guitar, backing vocals
Tim "Ripper" Owens – lead vocals
Tim Mills – lead guitar
Brent Smedley – drums

References

2007 EPs
Song cycles
Iced Earth EPs
SPV/Steamhammer EPs